Carlisle Airport (Pennsylvania)  is a publicly-owned, public use airport located one nautical miles (two mi, three km) southeast of the central business district of Carlisle, a city in Cumberland County, Pennsylvania, United States. This airport is owned and operated by South Middleton Township, Cumberland County, Pennsylvania.

Facilities and aircraft 
Carlisle Airport covers an area of 114 acres (46 ha) at an elevation of 510 feet (155 m) above mean sea level. It has one runway designated 10/28 with an asphalt surface measuring 4,008 by 60 feet (1,222 x 18 m). The airport has several instrument approaches, including a GPS approach to each runway.

For the 12-month period ending August 28, 2015, the airport had 24,500 aircraft operations, an average of 67 per day: 94% general aviation, 2% air taxi, and 4% military. At that time there were 60 aircraft based at this airport: 83% single-engine, 9% multi-engine, 7% helicopter, and 1% jet.

In September 2021, the Airport was purchased by South Middleton Township.  The Township has announced nearly $7.6 million in new enhancements at the Airport, to include constructing new corporate aircraft hangars, a medevac hangar, new terminal building, parallel taxiway, and other improvements. The goal is to have the projects completed by 2025.

References

External links 
 Cumberland Valley Aviation
Carlisle Airport at Pennsylvania DOT Bureau of Aviation
 
 

Airports in Pennsylvania
Transportation buildings and structures in Cumberland County, Pennsylvania